William Conrad Francis Smeed (born 26 October 2001) is an English cricketer. He made his Twenty20 debut on 11 September 2020, for Somerset in the 2020 T20 Blast.
On 10 August 2022 he became the first player to score a century in The Hundred (101* from 50 balls) for Birmingham Phoenix vs Southern Brave.

Biography
Smeed was a prep school pupil at Millfield School and  played rugby, football, hockey, tennis and competed in the hurdles, as well as playing cricket. From ages 13 to 18 Smeed was educated at independent school King's College, Taunton in Somerset, where he was a part of their cricket programme. He studied maths, further maths, chemistry and physics to A Level, achieving an A* in each subject. He is studying an undergraduate Open University degree in maths and economics.

In April 2022, he was bought by the Birmingham Phoenix for the 2022 season of The Hundred. He made his List A debut on 14 July 2022, for the England Lions during South Africa's tour of England.

References

External links
 

2001 births
Living people
English cricketers
Somerset cricketers
Sportspeople from Cambridge
People from Glastonbury
People educated at King's College, Taunton
Birmingham Phoenix cricketers
Quetta Gladiators cricketers
People educated at Millfield Preparatory School